Comitas obliquicosta is a species of sea snail, a marine gastropod mollusc in the family Pseudomelatomidae.

Description
The length of the shell attains 47 mm, its diameter 19 mm.

Distribution
This marine species occurs off Western Sumatra, Indonesia

References

 v. Martens, Sitzungsberichte d. Gesellsch. naturförschender Freunde Berlin, 1901, p. 16
  von Martens (1904) Die beschalten Gastropoden der deutschen Tiefsee-Expedition, 1898–1899.. In. A. Systematisch-geographischer Theil., vol. 7 Wissenschaftliche Ergebnisse der deutschen Tiefsee-Expedition auf dem Dampfer "Valdivia" 1898–1899, 1–146

External links
 

obliquicosta
Gastropods described in 1901